Radical 207 meaning "drum" is 1 of 4 Kangxi radicals (214 radicals total) composed of 13 strokes.

In the Kangxi Dictionary there are 46 characters (out of 49,030) to be found under this radical.

Characters with Radical 207

Literature

External links
Unihan Database - U+9F13

207